Senator Carney may refer to:

Charles J. Carney (1913–1987), Ohio State Senate
Francis Patrick Carney (1846–1902), Colorado State Senate